The year 689 BC was a year of the pre-Julian Roman calendar. In the Roman Empire, it was known as year 65 Ab urbe condita . The denomination 689 BC for this year has been used since the early medieval period, when the Anno Domini calendar era became the prevalent method in Europe for naming years.

Events

By place

Assyrian Empire 
 King Sennacherib of Assyria razes Babylon (or 691 BC).

Births

Deaths 
 Mushezib-Marduk, king of Babylon

References